The 2002 Energis Open was a men's tennis tournament played on outdoor clay courts in Amersfoort, the Netherlands and was part of the International Series of the 2002 ATP Tour. It was the 43rd edition of the tournament and ran from 15 July until 21 July 2002.  Second-seeded Juan Ignacio Chela won the singles title.

Finals

Singles

 Juan Ignacio Chela defeated  Albert Costa 6–1, 7–6(7–4)
 It was Chela's only title of the year and the 2nd of his career.

Doubles

 Jeff Coetzee /  Chris Haggard defeated  André Sá /  Alexandre Simoni 7–6(7–1), 6–3
 It was Coetzee's 1st title of the year and the 1st of his career. It was Haggard's 1st title of the year and the 2nd of his career.

References

External links
Singles draw
Doubles draw
Qualifying Singles draw

Energis Open
Dutch Open (tennis)
2002 in Dutch tennis
Energis Open, 2002